The following is a list of awards and nominations received by New Zealand actress Melanie Lynskey. Since winning her first accolade at the New Zealand Film Awards for her portrayal of Pauline Parker in Heavenly Creatures (1994), Lynskey has received various awards for her work in film and on television, including two Critics' Choice Awards—for playing Shauna on Showtime's Yellowjackets (2021–present)—and nominations for a Primetime Emmy Award, a Screen Actors Guild Award, an Independent Spirit Award, and three Gotham Awards.

Major associations

Primetime Emmy Awards

Screen Actors Guild Awards

Critics awards
Central Ohio Film Critics Association

Critics' Choice Super Awards

Critics' Choice Television Awards

Denver Film Critics Society

San Diego Film Critics Society Awards

Washington D.C. Area Film Critics Association Awards

Other awards
Autostraddle TV Awards

Awards Circuit Community Awards

Awards Daily Cooler Awards

Behind the Voice Actors Awards

Chicago Alt.Film Fest

CinEuphoria Awards

Dorian Awards

Fargo Film Festival

Gold Derby Awards

Gotham Independent Film Awards

Gracie Awards

Hollywood Critics Association

Independent Spirit Awards

International Online Cinema Awards

Lady Parts TV Awards

Monte-Carlo Television Festival

New Zealand Film and Television Awards

Online Film & Television Association

Pena de Prata

Satellite Awards

Saturn Awards

Sundance Film Festival

TCA Awards

Visa Entertainment Screen Awards

Honours

Hollywood Film Awards

RiverRun International Film Festival

Visa Entertainment Screen Awards

References

Acting awards
Awards for actresses